Lloc is a small village in Flintshire, north Wales. It is located within the community of Whitford. It lies north of the Clwydian Range, just east of the border with Denbighshire.

References

Villages in Flintshire